Henry Pettit Sweetland (July 29, 1827 - 1877) was a US politician, California pioneer, and town founder. He arrived in California in 1849. Sweetland and his brothers settled in the area that later bore their name, Sweetland, California, 1850; he ran a trading post in the settlement in 1852. He was a member of the California State Assembly in 1853. He married Augusta Ladd in 1855; they had no children. Sweetland died in California in 1877.

References

1827 births
1877 deaths
California pioneers
Members of the California State Assembly
People from Nevada County, California
19th-century American politicians